Mark Lajal (born 12 May 2003) is an Estonian tennis player.

Lajal has a career high ATP singles ranking of 388, achieved on 16 January 2023. He also has a career high ATP doubles ranking of 1376, achieved on 8 August 2022. On the junior tour, he had a career high ITF combined ranking of 13, achieved on 30 August 2021.

Lajal has won three ITF singles title.

Lajal represents Estonia at the Davis Cup, where he has a W/L record of 1–2.

Challenger and World Tennis Tour Finals

Singles: 5 (3–2)

References

External links

2003 births
Living people
Estonian male tennis players
21st-century Estonian people